San Giuliano may refer to:

 San-Giuliano, commune in the Haute-Corse department of France on the island of Corsica, in France
 San Giuliano del Sannio, comune in the Province of Campobasso in the Italian region Molise, in Italy
 San Giuliano di Puglia, town and comune in the province of Campobasso, in the region of Molise, in Italy
 San Giuliano Milanese, comune in the Metropolitan City of Milan in the Italian region Lombardy, in Italy
 San Giuliano Terme, comune in the Province of Pisa in the Italian region Tuscany, in Italy